Ben Webster at the Renaissance is a live album by American jazz saxophonist Ben Webster featuring tracks recorded in California in 1960 and released on the Contemporary label.

Reception

Allmusic awarded the album 4 stars with its review by Sott Yanow stating "the music is consistently wonderful... Webster (who was then somewhat taken for granted) is in superior and creative form. Recommended".

Track listing
 "Gone with the Wind" (Allie Wrubel, Herb Magidson) - 8:59 Bonus track on CD release   
 "Stardust" (Hoagy Carmichael, Mitchell Parish) - 10:59   
 "Caravan" (Juan Tizol) - 10:01   
 "Georgia on My Mind" (Hoagy Carmichael, Stuart Gorrell) - 6:37   
 "Ole Miss Blues" (W. C. Handy) - 6:42  
 "Mop Mop" (J. C. Heard, Teddy Wilson) - 8:06 Bonus track on CD release   
 "What Is This Thing Called Love" (Cole Porter) - 7:35 Bonus track on CD release   
 "Renaissance Blues" (Ben Webster, Frank Butler, Jim Hall, Jimmy Rowles, Red Mitchell) - 5:48 Bonus track on CD release

Personnel 
Ben Webster - tenor saxophone
Jim Hall - guitar  
Jimmy Rowles - piano
Red Mitchell - bass
Frank Butler - drums

References 

1985 live albums
Ben Webster live albums
Contemporary Records live albums